Italy was the host country of the ninth Winter Paralympics in Turin.

Participation
Italy entered 39 athletes in the following sports:
Alpine skiing: 10 male, 3 female
Ice sledge hockey: 15 male
Nordic skiing: 4 male, 2 female
Wheelchair curling: 3 male, 2 female

Medalist

See also
2006 Winter Paralympics
Italy at the 2006 Winter Olympics

External links
Torino 2006 Paralympic Games
International Paralympic Committee
Federazione Italiana Sport Disabili

2006
Nations at the 2006 Winter Paralympics
Winter Paralympics